Parliamentary elections took place in Kurdistan Region on 30 September 2018  to elect Parliament. The ruling Kurdistan Democratic Party (KDP) came first in a parliamentary election in the Kurdistan Region of Iraq, winning 45 seats, that positioning it to lead the next regional government.  A year after a failed bid for independence, Iraq’s Kurds voted last month in a parliamentary election. Announcement of the results was delayed for three weeks. The KDP’s historic rival and junior coalition partner in government, the Patriotic Union of Kurdistan (PUK), was in second place with 21 seats. The results suggest that Masoud Barzani’s KDP will take a dominant position in Kurdish politics.

Background

Following the end of the Gulf War in 1991, a civil war, mainly between the Erbil and Dohuk-based Kurdistan Democratic Party (KDP) and the Sulaymaniyah-based Patriotic Union of Kurdistan (PUK) led to the establishment of two separate Kurdish regional governments. Following the reconciliation and a power-sharing agreement between KDP and PUK, and Parliamentary elections in 2005, a unified Kurdistan Regional Government was created. The joint KDP–PUK faction Democratic Patriotic Alliance of Kurdistan assumed power and formed a government that was headed by Nechervan Barzani (KDP; 2006–09) and Barham Salih (PUK; 2009–12).

When former PUK official Nawshirwan Mustafa broke away to form the new Movement for Change (Gorran) party, the new party primarily hurt PUK's electoral support in the 2009 parliamentary elections. The KDP–PUK alliance, now renamed Kurdistan List, formed a new government headed by Nechervan Barzani.

Presidential elections were due to coincide with parliamentary elections in 2013. However, in the months leading to the elections the parliament extended Massoud Barzani’s term for another two years. When the parliamentary elections were held, the Kurdistan Democratic Party (KDP) and the Patriotic Union of Kurdistan (PUK) ran on separate lists for the first time since 1992. With its traditionally strong backing in Dohuk and Erbil provinces, the KDP managed to expand its plurality, while falling short of an outright majority. PUK suffered from internal conflicts during the absence of its leader Jalal Talabani, who was recovering from a stroke, and from strong competition by the Movement for Change (Gorran), which established itself as the strongest party in Sulaymaniyah, previously a major stronghold of PUK.

The provincial elections were delayed until November, and then again to 2014, when they were held in conjunction with the Iraqi parliamentary election.

In 2015, as Barzani's term was due to expire, debates continued as to whether it should be extended further, with supporters citing the Kurdish fight against ISIS and the need for stability in the Kurdish regional government. Others have expressed concern that a continued extension of Barzani's term could lead to a President for Life scenario.
Both Kurdish politicians and observers in the area worry that the polarizing debate over the presidency will destabilize Kurdish democracy and weaken the region in its fight against the Islamic State.
In July 2016, Barzani announced that he would not seek another term as president. The Kurdistan Region Parliament on 24 October 2017 announced that the elections for the presidency and the parliament had been delayed by eight months. The decision was made after the electoral commission stated that the political parties had failed to register their candidates amidst the regional crisis.

Parties participating in election
21 parties registered for Kurdistan's parliamentary elections:

 Coalition for Democracy and Justice (Barham Salih)
 Kurdistan Democratic Party (KDP)
 Turkmen Development Party
 Turkmen Democratic Movement in Kurdistan
 Change Movement (Gorran)
 Kurdistan Islamic Union (KIU)
 Assyrian Democratic Movement (Zowaa)
 Bet-Nahrain Democratic Party
 Individual Armenian Political Entity (Aram Birzo Hamo)
 Individual Armenian Political Entity (Obar Sipan Gharib)
 Turkmen Reform Party
 Kurdistan Islamic Group (Komal)
 Patriotic Union of Kurdistan (PUK)
 Yezidi Democratic Party
 Kurdistan Toilers' Party
 Kurdistan Socialist Democratic Party
 Chaldean Syriac Assyrian Popular Council
 Communist Party of Kurdistan – Iraq
 New Generation Movement
 Conservative Party of Kurdistan
 Toilers Party of Kurdistan

Electoral system

Notable participating entities

Results

References

2018 elections in Iraq
2018